Seaton is a village in County Durham, in England. It is on the A19 road south of Sunderland. It is located approximately 2 miles west of Seaham

The village has two pubs.

References

External links

Villages in County Durham